Øyungen is a lake in the municipality of Holtålen in Trøndelag county, Norway. The Forollhogna National Park surrounds the lake on three sides.

Name
The first part of the name is øy which means "island". The last element -ungen (Old Norse: -ungr) is a common suffix in names of lakes in Norway, for instance Kaldungen (meaning "the lake with cold water"), Svartungen (meaning "the black lake", Leirungen (meaning "the lake with clay"), and Sandungen (meaning "the lake with sand"). The lake Øyungen contains several small islets.

See also
List of lakes in Norway

References

Holtålen
Lakes of Trøndelag